The Canon EOS 100D, known as the EOS Rebel SL1 in the Americas and EOS Kiss X7 in Japan, is an 18.0-megapixel digital single-lens reflex camera announced by Canon on 21 March 2013. It has been described as the "world's smallest and lightest DSLR camera", either currently in production or in the APS-C format. Canon uses a smaller version of the APS-C sensor format than some other manufacturers including Nikon, Pentax, and Sony, with a crop factor of 1.6 rather than 1.5. It weighs 407 grams including battery and memory card.

The successor of the EOS 100D is the EOS 200D.

Features
The EOS 100D shares a similar set of features with the larger Canon EOS 700D. However, it does have an improved focus tracking system in live view mode called Hybrid CMOS AF II with 80% frame coverage.  The 700D has the previous version of Hybrid CMOS AF with much reduced frame coverage.

Features include:

 18.0 effective megapixel APS-C CMOS sensor
 DIGIC 5 image processor with 14-bit processing
 95% viewfinder frame coverage with 0.87x magnification
 1080p HD video recording at 24p, 25p (25 Hz) and 30p (29.97 Hz) with drop frame timing
 720p HD video recording at 50p (50 Hz) and 60p (59.94 Hz)
 480p ED video recording at 30p and 25p
 4.0 frames per second continuous shooting
 3" Clear View II LCD touchscreen with 1.04-megapixel resolution. The 100D has a fixed screen (unlike the articulated screen of the 700D and that camera's immediate predecessors, the 650D and 600D).
 3.5 mm microphone jack for external microphones or recorders
 9-point autofocus sensors with 1 cross type sensor in center
 The 100D model is also available in white body color. To go together with it the two lenses were produced also in white color: EF-S 18-55mm STM and EF 40mm.

References

External links

 Product page

100D
Live-preview digital cameras
Cameras introduced in 2013